Launch Area 5 (LA5) is an operational site at the RAAF Woomera Test Range which forms the primary operational capability of the Woomera Range Complex. Originally LA5 was a rocket launch site which supported a number of British experimental launches, including the United Kingdom's first, and  only, satellite launch. It consisted of three separate launch pads, which supported 22 Black Knight sounding rocket launches, and four Black Arrow carrier rocket launches. Of the four Black Arrow launches, two were orbital launches, the first of which, on 2 September 1970, failed, and the second, on 28 October 1971, succeeded, placing the Prospero satellite into low Earth orbit.

References

Rocket launch sites
Space programme of the United Kingdom